Nardovelifer altipinnis is the oldest known lamprid fish.  It dates from the Campanian age of Nardò, Italy.

References

Cretaceous bony fish
Prehistoric ray-finned fish genera
Veliferidae
Fossil taxa described in 1999
Fossils of Italy